Lars Kristian Huselius (born 10 November 1978) is a Swedish former professional ice hockey player.

Career
Huselius' hometown is Haninge, a municipality near Stockholm. He was drafted 47th overall at the 1997 NHL Entry Draft by the Florida Panthers and entered the National Hockey League (NHL) in 2002. A fast, skillful playmaker, Huselius typically plays on the wings and spent the early part of his career in the Swedish Elitserien, playing for Hammarby IF, Färjestad BK and Frölunda HC. The Panthers traded him to the Calgary Flames on December 2, 2005, where he managed 39 points in 54 games, adjusting well despite fears by some analysts that he would not fit into Calgary's physical, defensive playing style. In the 2006–07 season, he held a point-streak of 15 games, the second-highest in the NHL that season. Huselius also garnered a career-high 77 points that season, scoring 34 goals and adding 43 assists. During the 2007–08 season, Huselius recorded his first career NHL hat-trick against the Tampa Bay Lightning.

On 2 July 2008 Huselius signed a four-year, $19 million contract with the Columbus Blue Jackets. He recorded 21 goals during his first season with the Blue Jackets and also scored a goal during the Blue Jackets' first round playoff loss at the hands of the Detroit Red Wings; it was the Blue Jackets' first-ever appearance in the Stanley Cup playoffs. Huselius played in only 33 games for Columbus after tearing a chest muscle. Following the 2011–12 season, he was released. Huselius stated that the Blue Jackets had rushed his recovery, and that he was not given ample time to recover from his injury. He stated that he was forced into game action too early, which resulted in him pulling his groin muscle and forcing him to miss the rest of the season with a slow recovery. On 8 January 2013, just days after the 2012–13 NHL lockout ended, Huselius announced his retirement from professional hockey due to injury.

Suspension due to sex scandal
In 2005, Huselius and fellow Swedish hockey players Henrik Tallinder and Andreas Lilja were investigated on suspicion of sexual exploitation. In March 2005, all three players were suspended from the Swedish national team for one year, with Huselius and Tallinder being released by Linköpings HC and Lilja being suspended by Mora IK for the rest of the season.

On 9 February 2005 a 22-year-old woman accused the trio of raping her. Two days later, police dropped their investigation due to a lack of evidence. However, a special prosecutor reopened the case in March, leading to the suspensions. Huselius and the others were cleared in June of that year after a special prosecutor ruled there was no evidence they forced the woman to have sex.

Awards
NHL All-Rookie Team – 2002

Career statistics

Regular season and playoffs

International

References

External links

1978 births
Living people
AIK IF players
Calgary Flames players
Columbus Blue Jackets players
Färjestad BK players
Florida Panthers draft picks
Florida Panthers players
Frölunda HC players
Hammarby Hockey (1921–2008) players
Linköping HC players
People from Haninge Municipality
SC Rapperswil-Jona Lakers players
Swedish expatriate ice hockey players in Canada
Swedish expatriate sportspeople in Switzerland
Swedish expatriate ice hockey players in the United States
Swedish ice hockey left wingers
Sportspeople from Stockholm County